Patricio Daniel Sánchez Espina (born March 17, 1992, in Puebla City, Puebla), known as Patricio Sánchez, is a Mexican professional association football (soccer) player who plays for Irapuato F.C.

External links
 

Living people
1992 births
Footballers from Puebla
Liga MX players
Association footballers not categorized by position
People from Puebla (city)
21st-century Mexican people
Mexican footballers